Mason Fawns (born 10 January 1999) is an English semi-professional footballer who plays as a midfielder for Altrincham. He previously played professionally in the English Football League for Oldham Athletic.

Playing career
Fawns joined the youth team at Oldham Athletic after leaving the Academy at Blackburn Rovers in 2016. He scored four goals in 14 games for Tony Philliskirk's youth team before John Sheridan handed him his first professional (one-year) contract in June 2017. He made his first-team debut on 9 August, coming on as an 89th-minute substitute for Ousmane Fané in a 3–2 defeat to Burton Albion in a first round EFL Cup match at Boundary Park. He made his EFL League One debut three days later in a 2–1 defeat at Walsall. On 30 October, Fawns signed for Ashton United on a month long loan deal. He was loaned out to AFC Fylde on 18 January 2018 for the rest of the season.

He was released by Oldham at the end of the 2017–18 season, following their relegation.

He then joined Curzon Ashton.

Fawns joined Altrincham on 6 February 2019.

Career statistics

References

1999 births
Living people
English footballers
Association football midfielders
Blackburn Rovers F.C. players
Oldham Athletic A.F.C. players
English Football League players
Ashton United F.C. players
AFC Fylde players
Curzon Ashton F.C. players
Altrincham F.C. players